Anna Frajlich (born 1942), known also as Anna Frajlich-Zając, is a Polish-American poet and a Senior Lecturer Emerita at the Department of Slavic Languages and Associate Faculty Member, Harriman Institute at Columbia University in New York City, where she taught Polish language and literature for over three decades.

Early life and education 
Frajlich was born in 1942 in Kyrgyzstan to a Polish-Jewish family. The family was separated in 1941. Her father, Psachie Frajlich, a technician, found himself in Lysva, in Perm Region, in USSR, while her mother, Amalia, ended up in Kyrgyzstan where Anna was born. The family was able to reunite in Lysva in 1943. After the end of the war of World War II, in 1946, the family returned to Poland and settled in Szczecin.

Frajlich graduated from the University of Warsaw with the master's degree in Polish literature. She studied at the Slavic Department of the New York University where she was awarded a PhD in Russian literature in 1991. Her doctoral thesis "Legacy of Ancient Rome in the Russian Silver Age" was later published as a monograph.

Career
After completing her master's degree, she worked in publications for visually impaired people. In 1968–1969, the Communist government in Poland engaged in an anti-Semitic campaign that spurred the last significant emigration wave of Polish Jews from the country. Frajlich, together with her husband, engineer Władysław Zając, and son, emigrated to the United States in 1969.

Her first teaching job in the United States was at SUNY Stony Brook where she taught Polish language. In 1982, she started teaching Polish language and then literature at Columbia University, where she worked until her retirement in 2016. She started contributing to the Polish émigré press in the United States and Europe. She was also a freelance contributor to the Radio Free Europe, Polish Section. Anna Frajlich was the only Polish journalist from the Radio Free Europe to whom Czesław Miłosz granted an interview after he became the 1980 Nobel Prize winner in Literature.

She started writing and publishing her poetry in 1958 in weekly literary supplements in Warsaw, Szczecin and Poznań. Her first book of poetry "Aby wiatr namalować" ("To paint the wind") was published in 1976 in England. Her poetry in translation appeared in the US in journals "Mr. Cogito", "Artful Dodge", "Poet Lore", "Terra Poetica" and others since early 1980s.

In 2007, she was named an Honorary Ambassador of Szczecin (in Polish "Ambasador Szczecina").

She has published numerous books of poetry, essays and articles. Her poetry was translated into English, French, Italian, Spanish, Ukrainian and Russian languages. Frajlich is considered "not only a notable émigré poet, but, arguably, she is the most prominent Polish woman émigré poet of her generation".

Scholars who study Polish emigre poetry agree that prevalent focus of her poetry are the "themes of time, change, journeys, exile, home and habituation, tamed landscapes and remembered objects, spaces lost and regained" as well as the "themes of exile, emigration, dislocation, and adaptation to new cultural contexts"

On October 24–25, 2016, the University of Rzeszów, which specializes in the study of post-war Polish émigré literature, hosted a conference "Tu jestem/zamieszkuję własne życie" dedicated to the life and work of Anna Frajlich. The conference was co-sponsored by the Institute of Polish Philology of the Jagiellonian University in Kraków, the most prestigious center of literary studies in Poland. The conference program states, "Frajlich’s life and work are a microcosm of the entire twentieth century and bear witness to its tragedies, particularly the Holocaust and the Cold War. Claiming her as one of Poland’s most distinguished poets is a paradigmatic revolution in itself, the fusing of exile and homeland".

In 2022, the entire issue of the journal "The Polish Review" (2022, vol. 67, issue 1) was dedicated to her.

Personal life
Frajlich is married to Władysław Zając. She and her family currently live in New York City.

Bibliography

Selected books of poetry in Polish

Selected books of poetry in translation

Selected books of prose

Awards 
 Kościelski Foundation (Geneva) Literary Award, 1981
 Knight's Cross of Order of Merit, 2002
 W. & N. Turzanski Foundation (Toronto) Literary Prize, 2003
 Honorary Ambassador of Szczecin (Ambasador Szczecina)
 Union of Polish Writers in Exile (London) Literature Prize, 2015
 Wybitny Polak (Distinguished Pole in the United States), 2017
 Jubilee Medal of the John Paul II Catholic University of Lublin, Poland, 2020
 Szczecin University Medal, Poland, 2020
 The Susanne Lotarski Distinguished Achievement Award, 2020
 The Oscar Halecki Prize, 2021
 Wschodnia Fundacja Kultury Akcent, Lublin, Poland, 2022

External links 
 Anna Frajlich's website (English)
 Anna Frajlich's page on the EPIC pages, Emeritus Professors of Columbia (English)
 Frajlich's profile on Culture.pl (English)

References 

1942 births
Living people
Polish women poets
American women poets
Jewish Polish writers
Writers from Szczecin
University of Warsaw alumni
New York University alumni
Columbia University faculty
Polish poets
People associated with the magazine "Kultura"